Fredrikstad Fortress, under the command of Nils Christian Frederik Hals, was captured by the Swedish armed forces on 4 August 1814. 207 men remained in the fortress as the Norwegian surrendered to the Swedes; the rest had evacuated earlier. The Swedish casualties were few, 7 men killed and 12 wounded from the army, navy and Archipelago fleet combined.

Notes

References

Further reading
 
 
 
 

Fredrikstad
1814 in Sweden
1814 in Norway
Fredrikstad
Scandinavian history
Fredrikstad
Fredrikstad
Norway–Sweden relations
United Kingdoms of Sweden and Norway
Fredrikstad
August 1814 events